Márta Kucsora (Hungary 1979) is a contemporary artist, known primarily for her large scale abstract paintings.

Education
Kucsora graduated with a Masters of Fine Arts degree (MFA) from the Hungarian University of Fine Arts, and also attended Montclair State University’s MFA program (2005-2006).

Works

Kucsora had solo shows at Postmasters Gallery, the Kalman Maklary Fine Arts, the Kunsthalle, Budapest, and was included in museum shows at 21C Museum Bentonville, Hungarian National Gallery and Ernst Museum. In 2006, she co-founded the Budapest Art Factory and runs an International Artist Residency Program there.

Magda Sawon describes Kucsora’s works as heavily influenced by twentieth-century female artists, describing her art as "Resonating across time with Pollock's action, Frankenthaler's fluidity, 1980's Richter's abstract spatiality, and contemporary gestural abstraction's referentiality, Kucsora's update of brushless action paintings invariably reflects the performative process of their making. With a Polke-like penchant for experimentation, Kucsora expands her materialist repertoire of painterly media in her chemical "kitchen.""

In 2021, Kucsora presented her ten most significant works at Postmasters Gallery, New York. Her works highlighted the special use of materials, and her so-called continuous technique.

Selected solo exhibitions
2017 - Viscosity, The Concept Space, London, United Kingdom 
2018 - Imprints, Kálmán Makláry Fine Arts, Budapest, Hungary
2019 - all-over, Kálmán Makláry Fine Arts, Budapest, Hungary
2020 - An Abstract World, Galerie Benjamin Eck, München, Germany
2021 - Inception, Kunsthalle Budapest/Mucsarnok, Hungary 
2021 - Super Natural, Postmasters Gallery, New York, New York
2021 - Metaverse, Kálmán Makláry Fine Arts, Budapest, Hungary

Books
Direct Pictures (ISBN 978-963-7032-34-9) Ernst Múzeum, 2007, Budapest
Time of Painting, 2007, (ISBN 978-963-7432-95-8) Magyar Nemzeti Galéria, 2007, Budapest
Artonomy(ISBN 978-615-5695-31-5) Műcsarnok, 2007, Budapest
Personal, Fresh (ISBN 978-615-5695-45-2) Kunsthalle Budapest / Műcsarnok, 2021, Budapest
Márta Kucsora, (ISBN 978-89441-8-4) Kálmán Makláry Fine Arts, 2021, Budapest

References 

Living people
1979 births
Hungarian artists
Abstract artists
Hungarian University of Fine Arts alumni
Montclair State University alumni